Mark Petteway (June 12, 1961 – June 1, 1989) was an American basketball player who played professionally in Venezuela and Greece.

College career 
Petteway played for New Orleans Privateers men's basketball. He was the second scorer of his college at his first season with 15.8 points average. Moreover, he was the first scorer at the two next seasons, with 15.2 and 18.1 points accordingly.

Professional career 
Petteway was selected by Milwaukee Bucks in 1983 draft, but he never played in National Basketball Association. He played in Venezuela in 1984 and 1985 with Estudiantes de Caracas.
In 1987 he signed with PAOK, and along Delaney Rudd competed in 1987–88 FIBA Korać Cup. Petteway, in a game against KK Crvena zvezda, broke the basketball backboard, after a dunk from Rudd's assist. He went to the hospital for stitching, and he returned to the game at the 32nd minute. He send tied the game to 83–83 send it into overtime. Finally, PAOK lost with 93–88 but Petteway played bravely until the end of the game, despite the pain and the bleeding.
Ιn 1988 he moved to Apollon Patras B.C., along with other four fellow players, and he became Apollon's first foreign player. During this season Apollon was placed sixth place in the Greek Basket League which gave the qualification for 1989–90 FIBA Korać Cup. His personal best score was 45 points against AEK B.C. He played 23 games with Apollon, scoring 672 points (27.3 average) and 8.1 rebounds per game. 
In summer 1989, Petteway returned to United States. He killed on June 2, 1989.

References

1961 births
1989 deaths
American expatriate basketball people in Greece
American expatriate basketball people in Venezuela
American men's basketball players
Apollon Patras B.C. players
Basketball players from New Orleans
Brother Martin High School alumni
Junior college men's basketball players in the United States
Kansas City Sizzlers players
Milwaukee Bucks draft picks
Mississippi Gulf Coast Community College alumni
New Orleans Privateers men's basketball players
P.A.O.K. BC players
Power forwards (basketball)
Small forwards